Bochmann is a German surname. Notable people with the surname include:

Annika Bochmann (born 1991), German sailor
Georg Bochmann (1913–1973), German SS officer
Gregor von Bochmann (1850–1930), Baltic-German painter
Gregor von Bochmann (computer scientist) (born 1941), German-Canadian computer scientist
Manfred Bochmann (1928–2011), East German politician
Werner Bochmann (1900–1993), German composer

See also
Bochman

German-language surnames